Newsboys (sometimes stylised as newsboys) are a Christian rock band founded in 1985 in Mooloolaba, Queensland, Australia, by Peter Furler and George Perdikis. Now based in Nashville, Tennessee, the band has released 17 studio albums, 6 of which have been certified gold. As of 2019, the band consists of lead vocalist Michael Tait (formerly of DC Talk), drummer and percussionist Duncan Phillips, keyboardist and bassist Jeff Frankenstein, and guitarist Jody Davis. In addition to performing music, the band has appeared in the films God's Not Dead, God's Not Dead 2, and God's Not Dead: A Light In Darkness.

History

1980s 

The band was formed in Mooloolaba, Queensland, Australia in 1985 by two young men: Peter Furler and his school mate George Perdikis. Furler and Perdikis practised in a garage on the Sunshine Coast, well known for being a "surfer's paradise". Two other teens were added soon after: Furler's best friend, John James, and bassist Sean Taylor. The band's original name was The News but they changed to Newsboys to prevent confusion with US-based band Huey Lewis and the News. Newsboys came to the United States in late 1987 after getting signed with Refuge Communications and released the album Read All About It in 1988 in the United States.

1990s 

After signing with Star Song Communications, they released two more albums in 1990 and 1991: Hell Is for Wimps and Boys Will Be Boyz, with its first self-titled video. None of the band's first three albums garnered much attention and the band's line-up changed with every release.

It wasn't until their 1992 album, Not Ashamed (containing a cover of the DeGarmo & Key song "Boycott Hell"), that the band gained notice in the Christian music scene with its second self-titled video that followed a year later. Steve Taylor, a singer-songwriter and producer, began a partnership with the band, producing the band's record and writing most of the lyrics for their songs. Furler remained the band's primary songwriter and beginning with this album began sharing lead vocal duties with James and continued to do so until James' departure.

In 1994 amidst continued line-up changes (which included the addition of mainstays Jody Davis and Duncan Phillips), the band released Going Public, their fifth album and first real success. The record proved to be a watershed for the group, winning a 1995 Dove Award for "Rock Album of the Year". It also produced four No. 1 hits: "Spirit Thing", "Real Good Thing", "Truth and Consequences", and, most notably, "Shine". "Shine" won the 1995 Dove for "Rock Recorded Song of the Year". In 2006, CCM Magazine listed "Shine" in the top 10 in its ranking of the 100 Greatest Songs in Christian music.

The 1996 follow-up album Take Me to Your Leader was recorded with an expanded line up with new additions bassist Phil Joel and keyboardist Jeff Frankenstein. The album produced three more pop No. 1 hits: "Reality", "Let It Go", and the title track, two rock No. 1 hits: "Cup O' Tea" and "Breathe", as well as fan favourite and concert staple "Breakfast". This album also won the group's third Dove, this time for "Recorded Music Packaging of the Year". This album spawned the Newsboys' first movie, Down Under the Big Top (1996), which was based on the song "Reality".

In late 1997 just after completing the Take Me To Your Leader Tour and  James announced he would be leaving the band to start a preaching ministry. In 2007 he revealed the actual reason was due to a drug and alcohol addiction. With his departure, Furler moved from drums to vocals and auditions were held for the now-vacant drum position. Eventually, Duncan Phillips, who had previously played keyboards and percussion for the band moved over to the drum kit. From 1998 to 2003, the band's line-up of Furler, bassist Phil Joel, guitarist Jody Davis, keyboardist Jeff Frankenstein and Phillips stayed constant and in 1997 Newsboys hit the studio to record Step Up The Microphone 

The first post-James record , Step Up to the Microphone, sold well and produced four No. 1 hits: "Entertaining Angels", "WooHoo", "Believe", and the title track. It also spawned the Newsboys' live video, "Live One Night In Pennsylvania" a year later. "Entertaining Angels" won the 1999 Dove for "Short Form Music Video of the Year". 
and 
in Late 1998 they went into the studio to record Love Liberty Disco

The band returned in 1999 with Love Liberty Disco, the band's only album to significantly deviate from their pop rock sound. Instead, this particular album featured more of a disco sound. Still, it produced several hits, including the No. 1 hits "Beautiful Sound" and "Good Stuff" as well as the title track. The LLD tour was significantly more popular than the album. This tour featured an inflatable arena, called the Air Dome.

In 1999, Furler co-founded Inpop Records with Wes Campbell as an independent contemporary Christian music record label.

2000s 

In 2000, Newsboys headlined the annual, travelling CCM concert, Festival Con Dios, with Audio Adrenaline and The O.C. Supertones. That same year, Newsboys released a greatest hits compilation, Shine: The Hits, which did not include any songs from the Love Liberty Disco album, but included four new songs, two of which ("Joy" and "Who?") went to No. 1. After this album the band did not release any new material until the 2002 release of Thrive, a record that produced two No. 1 singles: "Million Pieces (Kissin' Your Cares Goodbye)" and the praise and worship-driven "It Is You", which proved to be the biggest hit of their career up to that point also with its video, Thrive: From The Rock And Roll Hall Of Fame. Also in 2002, The Newsboys recorded the track "In the Belly of the Whale" for the end credits of the 2002 movie Jonah: A VeggieTales Movie.

After the success of "It Is You", the Newsboys then followed with two praise and worship albums: Adoration: The Worship Album in 2003 and Devotion in 2004. Late in 2003, Davis departed and was replaced by Bryan Olesen on guitar. In 2005, The Newsboys co-authored a book of devotions with Jim Laffoon entitled Our Daily Blog which was published by Inspiro and released on 1 November. They also recorded their Creation 2005 set for a live DVD to be released with their upcoming album. In 2006, Olesen left the band to focus on his own band Casting Pearls and was replaced by Paul Colman, formerly of Paul Colman Trio.

More radio hits came in 2006 with a live version of "I Am Free" (originally written by Jon Egan of the Desperation Band), and "Wherever We Go". On 31 October 2006, The Newsboys released a pop/rock record entitled GO. GO featured David Eri as a co-writer and the songs "Something Beautiful" and "In Wonder" were big hits on Christian Radio. That December, Joel announced that he would leave the band to pursue his own projects and albums. On 8 May 2007, the band released GO Remixed which was made up of new versions of the songs from GO and featured remixes by Tedd T., Jeff Frankenstein, Max Hsu of Superchick and Lee Bridges.

On 20 November 2007 the Newsboys released their second greatest hits compilation, The Greatest Hits. The eighteen-song CD also features two new songs "I Fought the La..." and "Stay Strong". This album was followed by Newsboys Live: Houston We Are GO, a CD/DVD combo recording package of a show from the GO Tour, which was released on 30 September 2008. Also in 2008, the band, with Steve Taylor providing vocals, recorded the song "Yo Ho Hero" for The Pirates Who Don't Do Anything: A VeggieTales Movie. In 2007, the band's co-founder George Perdikis renounced Christianity and declared himself an atheist. He had not been involved with the band for seventeen years, nor was he in any way involved with their commercially and critically successful singles or albums.

On 5 January 2009, Colman announced he would be leaving The Newsboys to return to his solo projects. At the same time, it was announced that Davis would return to the band, after a five-year hiatus. "I am thrilled to be returning to the band and back with my bandmates, who are some of my best friends," says Davis, "this is a big change in my life, and I'm looking forward to the tour and new record with excitement."

In 2009, it was announced that Furler, having toured with The Newsboys since the band's inception, had decided to step back into a support role and would continue as the band's primary songwriter and producer. Because of this, a replacement lead vocalist was required so the band could continue touring. On 9 March 2009, it was announced that Michael Tait, formerly of dc Talk, would be the new lead singer. "Michael Tait will be touring with the band as lead singer with Furler making special appearances throughout the year. Furler will continue with the band and his trademark songwriting and production will remain as he focuses his professional career toward future Newsboys recordings." On 17 March, Tait performed his first full concert as lead singer in Highlands Ranch, Colorado.

The Newsboys released the studio album In the Hands of God on 5 May on Inpop Records with Max Hsu producing the album. Long-time collaborator Steve Taylor co-wrote all the songs and sang on one song. During their concert of 11 September in Orlando, Furler announced that this would be his final guest appearance with the band.

2010s 
The Newsboys' first studio album featuring lead singer Michael Tait, Born Again, was released on 13 July 2010 and debuted at No. 4 on the Billboard 200, their highest debut position, and sold over 45,000 copies in its first week. On 12 October 2010 they released the Christmas album, Christmas! A Newsboys Holiday featuring "The Christmas Song" by Tait. In 2011, the song "City to City" from GO Remixed was featured in the trailer for the Disney Pixar movie, Cars 2.

God's Not Dead was released 15 November 2011. Their newest live album, title Live in Concert: God's Not Dead, came out on 22 October 2012. In the same year they released their single "The League of Incredible Vegetables" for the VeggieTales video of the same name. The band released their 16th studio album Restart on 10 September 2013. The "Restart Tour" ran from 20 September to 27 October 2013. The band is also a part of the Winter Jam Tour 2013 from November 2013 through March 2014.

The band appeared in a sequence for the film God's Not Dead, released in 2014. Michael Tait expressed excitement about the film to The Global Dispatch during an interview, saying that "The movie is powerful because of the whole stance of it…just trying to prove God's existence…sharing the gospel, living the lifestyle, changing the mindset of people around them in this college, in this university." Duncan Phillips added in a similar interview that "Disney's Shane Harper plays a college student whose faith is challenged by his professor, played by Kevin Sorbo from Hercules. Dean Cain from Superman is in it, too. So we got to hang out with a bunch of superheroes. The movie raises a lot of questions and a lot of eyebrows from a culture that questions if there is a God."

The band then embarked on the "We Believe Tour". They performed at the BigChurchDayOut 2014 and again in 2017. In 2015, the Newsboys started the "We Believe God's Not Dead Tour". Love Riot was released in 2016 and a tour followed. The band also appeared in the 2016 film God's Not Dead 2.

It was announced in late 2017 that Peter Furler and Phil Joel would participate with Newsboys on the Newsboys United Tour in 2018. Along with the tour, it was announced that the band is doing an album, United, with Furler and Joel, which was released 10 May 2019. The last tour date with Furler and Joel was in August 2021. The band subsequently released Stand on 1 October 2021.

Members 
Current
 Jody Davis – guitar, backing vocals (1992–2003, 2009–present)
 Duncan Phillips – drums (1997–present), percussion (1993–present), keyboards (1993–1997)
 Jeff Frankenstein – keyboards, synth bass (1994–present), backing vocals (2007–present)
 Michael Tait – lead vocals (2009–present)

Former
 Peter Furler – lead vocals (1997–2009, 2018–2021), guitar (1996–2009, 2018–2021), co-lead and backing vocals, drums (1985–1997)
 John James – lead vocals (1986–1997)
 Corey Pryor – keyboards (1989–1990, 1991–1993) – left to play with his wife in a band called SoZo 
 Sean Taylor – bass (1986–1992) – left to pursue a career in education 
 Kevin Mills – bass (1992–1994, deceased 2000) – left the band to manage White Heart 
 George Perdikis – guitar (1985–1987) – left the band before their first album, but co-wrote most of the songs 
 Phil Yates – guitar (1987–1990)
 Jonathan Geange – guitar (1990–1991, 1992) – returned to the band briefly after Vernon Bishop left, before Jody Davis joined 
 Vernon Bishop – guitar (1991–1992)
 Phil Joel – bass guitar, vocals (1994–2006, 2018–2021)
 Bryan Olesen – guitar (2004–2006) – left to front his original band VOTA on a full-time basis 
 Paul Colman – guitar (2006–2009) – left to work on his solo career and Paul Colman Trio

Touring
 Dylan Garza – bass guitar (2022–present)
 Sean McCaffery – rhythm guitar, backing vocals (2022–present)

Timeline

Major tours 

 The Story music tour (1–18 December 2011) with Francesca Battistelli, Steven Curtis Chapman, Natalie Grant, Anthem Lights and Selah
 God's Not Dead Tour – February–May 2013 with Building 429 (first leg), Britt Nicole (second leg), All Things New and CAMPBELL
 Restart Tour – September 2013 – October 2013 with For King & Country, Moriah Peters and Rapture Ruckus
 Love Riot Summer 2016
 Newsboys United Spring Tour 2018
 United and Surrounded Tour 2019 with Michael W. Smith
 Jesus Freak Cruise 10–14 June 2019 with TobyMac, Kevin Max, John Crist, Mandisa, Aaron Cole and Ryan Stevenson
 Greatness of Our God Tour 2019 with Ryan Stevenson, Adam Agee and Kevin Max
 Stand Together Tour 2022 with Danny Gokey, Mac Powell, and Adam Agee
 Let the Music Speak Tour 2023 with Adam Agee

Discography 

John James era

 Read All About It (1988)
 Hell Is for Wimps (1990)
 Boys Will Be Boyz (1991)
 Not Ashamed (1992)
 Going Public (1994)
 Take Me to Your Leader (1996)

Peter Furler era

 Step Up to the Microphone (1998)
 Love Liberty Disco (1999)
 Thrive (2002)
 Adoration: The Worship Album (2003)
 Devotion (2004)
 Go (2006)
 In the Hands of God (2009)

Michael Tait era

 Born Again (2010)
 God's Not Dead (2011)
 Restart (2013)
 Hallelujah for the Cross (2014)
 Love Riot (2016)
 United (2019)
 Stand (2021)

Awards and nominations

Grammy Awards 

|-
| 1992 || Not Ashamed || Best Rock/Contemporary Gospel Album || 
|-
| 1994 || Going Public || Best Rock Gospel Album || 
|-
| 1996 || Take Me To Your Leader || Best Rock Gospel Album || 
|-
| 2003 || Adoration: The Worship Album || Best Pop/Contemporary Gospel Album || 
|-

Dove Awards 

|-
| 1993 || "I Cannot Get You Out of My System" || Short Form Music Video of the Year || 
|-
| rowspan=5| 1994
|-
| rowspan=2| "Going Public" || Rock Album of the Year || 
|-
| | Group of the Year || 
|-
| rowspan=2| "Shine" || Rock Recorded Song of the Year || 
|-
| | Short Form Music Video of the Year || 
|-
| 1996 || "Shine" || Song of the Year || 
|-
| rowspan=5| 1997
|-
| rowspan=3| "Take Me To Your Leader" || Rock Album of the Year || 
|-
| |Short Form Music Video of the Year || 
|-
| | Recorded Music Packaging of the Year || 
|-
| | "God Is Not a Secret" || Rock Recorded Song of the Year || 
|-
| rowspan=4| 1999
|-
| rowspan=3| "Entertaining Angels" || Song of the Year || 
|-
| | Group of the Year || 
|-
| |Short Form Music Video of the Year || 
|-
| 2000 || "One Night in Pennsylvania" || Long Form Music Video of the Year || 
|-
| rowspan=2| 2001 || "Love Liberty Disco" || Short Form Music Video of the Year || 
|-
| | "City on a Hill: Songs of Worship and Praise" || Special Event Album of the Year || 
|-
| 2003 || "Thrive: Live from the Rock and Roll Hall of Fame" || Long Form Music Video of the Year || 
|-
| rowspan=5| 2004
|-
| rowspan=2| "He Reigns" || Worship Song of the Year || 
|-
| | Song of the Year || 
|-
| | "Adoration: The Worship Album" || Praise & Worship Album of the Year || 
|-
| |"n/a" || Group of the Year || 
|-
| 2005 || "Devotion" || Praise & Worship Album of the Year || 
|-
| 2008 || "Go: Remixed" || Pop/Contemporary Album of the Year || 
|-
| rowspan=3| 2012
|-
| | "Born Again" || Rock Song of the Year || 
|-
| | "Miracles" || Short Form Music Video of the Year || 
|-
| 2013 || "Jesus, Firm Foundation: Hymns of Worship" || Special Event Album of the Year || 
|-
| rowspan=3| 2015
|-
| rowspan=2 | "We Believe" || Pop/Contemporary Song of the Year || 
|-
| | Song of the Year || 
|-
| rowspan=2| 2016 || "Love Riot" || Pop/Contemporary Album of the Year || 
|-
| | "We Believe" || Worship Song of the Year || 
|-

Billboard Music Video Awards 

 1999 Award for Best CCM Video
 "Entertaining Angels"

Intl. Angel Awards 

 1995 Award for Video
 "Shine"
 1999 Award for Video
 "Entertaining Angels"

Nashville Music Awards 

 1999 Award for Favorite CCM Album
 Step Up to the Microphone
 2000 Nomination for Contemporary Christian Album of the Year
 Love Liberty Disco

SESAC Awards 

 2000 Award for Christian Songwriter of the Year
 Peter Furler

References

External links 

 

Australian Christian rock groups
Musical groups established in 1985
Inpop Records artists
Performers of contemporary Christian music
Sparrow Records artists
1985 establishments in Australia